Shurdh is a weather and storm god in Albanian pagan mythology, who causes hailstorms and throws thunder and lightning. Shurdh was worshiped in northern Albania until recent times.

He is thought to have been an ancient Illyrian god. In Albanian mythology Shurdhi is the counterpart of the fire and wind god Verbti. Shurdhi could be related to the sky and lightning god Zojz, and to the presumable sky and weather god Perëndi. Some of Shurdhi's attributes can be found in the mythological figure of drangue.

Name 
The name Shurdhi appears to be connected with the Albanian term i shurdhët meaning "the deaf one", however, this link seems to be only a coincidence, since the name Shurdh must be a compound of *seuro, "water" (cf. Albanian shurrë "urine"), and *dos "giver/donor" (cf. Albanian dhashë/dha, "I gave/he gave"); his name thus means "water donor". Some scholars have suggested a relation between the name Shurdh and the second part of the theonym Zibelsurdus found in ancient Thracian epigraphic monuments.

The theonym Shurdh could be related to the name of the island of Shurdhah near Shkodër, and it is found in the oronym Maja Shurdh ("Shurdh Peak") in Kelmendi, and the toponym mi Shurdh, a region in Mirdita.

Folk beliefs 
According to folk beliefs, Shurdhi travels using storm clouds which announce hailstorms when he arrives. He can be greeted and turned away with noise and gunshots. The Albanologist Baron Nopcsa identified Shurdhi with the ancient Thracian thunder deity Zibelsurdus, who was also greeted with weapons. According to Karl Treimer, the basic form perejont-, "the striker", of the Albanian divine name Perëndi may be an epithet of the thunderstorm god Shurdh, who may have been a favorite god since he refreshed pastures and fields and was probably also of a warlike nature after the epithet given to him.

See also

Albanian mythology
Drangue
En (deity)
Zojz (deity)
Perëndi
Verbti

Sources

Citations

Bibliography

Albanian mythology
Sky and weather gods